The Thabet-Thabet Building, so named after its original owner, is a skyscraper situated along the banks of the river Nile in the Cairo suburb of Garden City, Egypt. Naoum Shebib was the architect, structural engineer and contractor for this 31 story building, completed in 1958.

The building is also popularly known to locals as the Belmont Building, as it once hosted a large advertisement for Belmont cigarettes on its rooftop

See also
Skyscraper design and construction
List of tallest buildings in Africa

References

1958 establishments in Egypt
Buildings and structures in Cairo
Hotel buildings completed in 1958